DVD Profiler is a program that allows users to catalogue their DVD collections. The program was created by Ken Cole at InterVocative Software. Although it can be used for free (with free registration), it can be upgraded to a premium registration for a one-time fee.  Registration allows users to download higher-resolution cover scans, to vote on all changes to the DVD database, and to use the newest beta versions of the software.

DVD Profiler permits the adding of DVDs (since V3.0, HD DVDs and Blu-ray Discs, since V4.0 Ultra HD Blu-rays) by entering the UPC/EAN, inserting the disc itself into the computer's DVD drive or searching by title. Users can upload their collection to the internet to provide other users the possibility to view their DVD profiles.

Also available is DVD Profiler Mobile, which allows the user to access your DVD Profiler database via a Pocket PC. You can also make changes to your database directly in DVD Profiler Mobile and synchronize back to your main DVD Profiler database.

Since December 2010 there's also an app for iPhone and iPad available which works as a standalone product or in combination with the Desktop version.

As of May 17, 2013, a version for Android has been released.

Up through version 2.4 the program was released and maintained by InterVocative Software. Version 3.0 is released and maintained by Invelos Software, a company set up by developer Ken Cole to focus entirely on DVD Profiler and related products & services.

A major drawback is the lack of support for Unicode, which makes it impossible to enter Asian DVD titles correctly.  Another drawback is that after years of fully functional ad-supported versions, from version 3.0 onwards, users cannot use most features with collections over 50 discs without buying the software.

Legal issues 
On April 5, 2007, Jesse Slicer, Kenneth Meade, and InterVocative Software, LLC (represented by Tim Haverty) filed an injunction (Case # 07CY-CV03512) in Missouri's 7th Judicial District (Clay County) against Ken Cole and Invelos, LLC (represented by Joseph Gall). Judge Anthony Gabbert presided.

On May 9, 2007 the issue was resolved to the satisfaction of both companies, and InterVocative Software became a wholly owned subsidiary of Invelos Software, Inc.

Versions

External links 
Invelos's DVD Profiler
Release Notes

References 

Personal information managers